"Baby Wants to Rock" is a song by Australian rock band Mondo Rock, released in March 1984 as the second single from the band's fourth studio album The Modern Bop (1984). The song peaked at number 18 on the Kent Music Report.

Track listings 
Aus 7" Single
 "Baby Wants to Rock" - 4:29
 "Winds Light to Variable" - 4:14

Charts

References

Mondo Rock songs
1984 singles
1983 songs
Songs written by Ross Wilson (musician)
Warner Music Group singles